Candaharia is a genus of air-breathing land slugs, terrestrial gastropod mollusks in the family Parmacellidae.

Species
Species within the genus Candaharia include:

subgenus Candaharia
 Candaharia rutellum (Hutton, 1849) - type species

subgenus Levanderiella Schileyko, 2007
 Candaharia levanderi (Simroth, 1901)

subgenus ?
 Candaharia aethiops (Westerlund, 1896)
 Candaharia izzatullaevi Likharev & Wiktor, 1980

References 

Parmacellidae